Matrix product state (MPS) is a quantum state of many particles (in N sites), written in the following form:

 

where  are complex, square matrices of order  (this dimension is called local dimension). Indices  go over states in the computational basis.

It is particularly useful for dealing with ground states of one-dimensional quantum spin models (e.g. Heisenberg model (quantum)).
The parameter  is related to the entanglement between particles.

For states that are translationally symmetric, we can choose:
 

In general, every state can be written in the MPS form (with  growing exponentially with the particle number N). However, MPS are practical when   is small – for example, does not depend on the particle number. Except for a small number of specific cases (some mentioned in the section Examples), such a thing is not possible, though in many cases it serves as a good approximation.

The MPS decomposition is not unique.  For introductions see  and. In the context of finite automata see. For emphasis placed on the graphical reasoning of tensor networks, see the introduction.

Obtaining MPS 
One method to obtain an MPS representation of a quantum state is to use Schmidt decomposition  times.  Alternatively if the quantum circuit which prepares the many body state is known, one could first try to obtain a matrix product operator representation of the circuit. The local tensors in the matrix product operator will be four index tensors.  The local MPS tensor is obtained by contracting one physical index of the local MPO tensor with the state which is injected into the quantum circuit at that site.

Examples

Greenberger–Horne–Zeilinger state 
Greenberger–Horne–Zeilinger state, which for  particles can be written as superposition of  zeros and  ones 

can be expressed as a Matrix Product State, up to normalization, with

or equivalently, using notation from:

This notation uses matrices with entries being state vectors (instead of complex numbers), and when multiplying matrices using tensor product for its entries (instead of product of two complex numbers). Such matrix is constructed as

Note that tensor product is not commutative.

In this particular example, a product of two A matrices is:

W state 
W state, i.e., the superposition of all the computational basis states of Hamming weight one. Even though the state is permutation-symmetric, its simplest MPS representation is not. For example:

AKLT model 

The AKLT ground state wavefunction, which is the historical example of MPS approach:,  corresponds to the choice

 

 

 

Majumdar–Ghosh model 

Majumdar–Ghosh ground state can be written as MPS with

See also 
 Density matrix renormalization group
 Variational method (quantum mechanics)
 Renormalization
 Markov chain
Tensor network

References

External links 
 Open-source review article focused on tensor network algorithms, applications, and software
 State of Matrix Product States – Physics Stack Exchange
 A Practical Introduction to Tensor Networks: Matrix Product States and Projected Entangled Pair States
 Hand-waving and Interpretive Dance: An Introductory Course on Tensor Networks
 Tensor Networks in a Nutshell: An Introduction to Tensor Networks

Mathematical physics
Quantum states